Yassy may refer to:

 Iași, a city in north-eastern Romania, former capital of the Principality of Moldavia
 Hazrat-e Turkestan, a town in Kazakhstan 
 A right tributary of the Kara Darya in Kyrgyzstan

See also
 Iasi (disambiguation)
 Jassy (disambiguation)